Go is an American television game show created by Bob Stewart and aired on NBC from October 3, 1983, to January 20, 1984. The show featured two teams, each composed of four contestants and a celebrity. The teams had to construct questions one word at a time to convey a word or phrase to their teammates. The concept of Go was based on "Instant Reaction", an endgame played on two different iterations of another game show created by Bob Stewart, Chain Reaction - in 1980 on NBC and from 2006 to 2007 on GSN.

Los Angeles and Buffalo meteorologist Kevin O'Connell was the show's host, and Johnny Gilbert was the announcer, with Jack Clark substituting for him during November 1983.

Main game
Two teams, each consisting of one celebrity captain and four contestants, competed. Each team selected one member to guess words/phrases based on clues given by the other four; this member kept his/her role throughout the entire game.

The team that played first in any round blindly selected one of two packets of words/phrases, and the four clue-givers sat in a line. The first two constructed a clue question by alternately giving one word at a time, and rang a bell to indicate when they had finished. If the guesser answered correctly, he/she moved on to hear a new clue from the middle two givers, then the last two; upon reaching the end of the line, he/she began moving back up toward its start. If the guesser answered incorrectly, or if the givers constructed an illegal question or passed, the guesser could not advance and a new word was played. The team's turn ended after 99 seconds or five correct answers, whichever came first, and the opposing team then played the unused packet in an attempt to win the round by outscoring them or beating their time. 

A maximum of four rounds were played, with the teams alternating first-play honors from one round to the next. The winner of each round scored points: 250 in round one, 500 in round two, 750 in round three, 1,250 in round four (if necessary). The first team to score at least 1,500 points won the game, received $1 per point, and advanced to the Jackpot Round.

Jackpot Round
The guesser of the winning team was given 60 seconds to identify seven subjects based on clue questions constructed by the others as in the main game. All four clue-givers participated in the first subject, but one of them had to drop out after each correct answer until only one clue-giver was playing the fourth subject. Once this subject was guessed correctly, the clue-givers returned one at a time in reverse order until they were all playing the seventh subject. 

The team won $10,000 for guessing seven subjects, or $200 per correct guess if time ran out. Any team that defeated their opponents 1,500-0 after the first three rounds in the main game (referred to as a "clean sweep") played the round twice, for a potential jackpot of $20,000.

Champions
Originally one of the two teams consisted of one new team and a returning champion. The champions could return until they were defeated or won five times, and the losing team received parting gifts. After the first four weeks, the format changed and both teams competed for the entire week, rotating celebrity captains each day.

The maximum potential winnings total for any team was $107,500, requiring five "clean sweep" victories in the front game and a double jackpot win after each one.

From November 7 to 11, 1983 and again from November 28 to December 3, 1983, Go! had an all-star "Battle of the Daytime Soaps". The first week pitted the cast of Days of Our Lives against the cast of Another World, while the second saw Another World returning to take on the cast of Search for Tomorrow, with all winnings going to charity. It was during these two weeks that Jack Clark filled in as announcer for Johnny Gilbert.

Broadcast History
Go aired at 12:00 noon ET/11:00 AM CT/MT/PT on NBC, long a problem time slot for the three major broadcast networks at the time, as their local affiliates would often preempt network programming to air newscasts or syndicated fare. The noon slot was also home to Family Feud, which was the top-rated daytime game show carried on ABC, and in some markets CBS aired the first half of The Young and the Restless. 

Since the cancellation of Password Plus, which had aired in the noon hour for most of its run, in 1982, NBC had tried three different first-run programs in the noon slot. The first was their longtime serial The Doctors, which had seen a massive ratings collapse that would eventually result in its cancellation at the end of 1982. NBC then tried two game shows in the slot; the first, Just Men!, premiered on January 3, 1983 but was cancelled after thirteen weeks, and the second, The New Battlestars, launched on April 4 and met the exact same fate. Go managed a total of sixteen weeks before it too was cancelled.

Episode status
The series was rebroadcast on CBN and Game Show Network at various times.

British version
A short-lived British version titled Get Set Go, hosted by Michael Barrymore along with co-host Julia Gale, aired on BBC1 from September 10 to November 26, 1984.

References

External links
 

NBC original programming
1980s American game shows
1983 American television series debuts
1984 American television series endings
Television series by Bob Stewart Productions
Television series by Sony Pictures Television
English-language television shows
1980s British game shows